Florimond II Robertet de Fresne (1531–1567) was a Secretary of State to Francis II of France, and Charles IX of France.

Family
He was the son of Francis Robertet Bullion Secretary to Pierre de Beaujeu, Duc de Bourbon and Drill, husband of Anne of France, who, without the title of regent, ruled the kingdom during the minority of Charles VIII of France, as ordered by the dying Louis XI.

All his family were attached to the Guises, and he had their support, and was appointed Secretary of State at 26 years old (1557). He cultivated the arts and letters; in addition to his duties, he performed from the reign of Henry II of France to that of Charles IX. 
If his career was short, it was no less remarkable for the acts to which he contributed, and to which he attached his name. In 1559, he signed with the usual form: by the Board's view, the power given to the Duke of Guise, on behalf of Francis II, after the conspiracy of Amboise, to the Chancellor Olivier, despite written policy, that he had long refused to sign, because it gave the Duke of Guise nothing less than royal power, under the title of lieutenant general of the kingdom. 
In 1560, Robertet de Fresne, wrote on behalf of Francis II, the letter to the King of Navarre on the injunction to get his brother the Prince de Conde, to come to Orleans.  Antoine de Bourbon complied unwisely, since the prince his brother was arrested, as leader of the conspiracy of Amboise, and sentenced to death.

Florimond II died at the age of 36 years without a child. He spent part of his life at the Chateau de Beauregard, where a painting of his cousin Florimond is displayed in the portrait gallery. Simon Fizes, baron de Sauves succeeded him in the office of Secretary of State.

Colette La Loer married Francois Robertet's older brother Florimont I. She had at least 2 children Jean and Anne Robertet. Jean (grandson of Francis and nephew of Florimont I) married Jeanne Viste with at least 2 children also Florimont II and Mary.

References

1531 births
1567 deaths
French Foreign Ministers
16th-century French diplomats